Santa Monica High School, officially abbreviated to SaMoHi, is located in Santa Monica, California. Founded in 1891, it changed location several times in its early years before settling into its present campus at 601 Pico Boulevard. It is a part of the Santa Monica–Malibu Unified School District.

History

In 1891, the Union High School Law was passed in Santa Monica, thereby establishing a four-year high school for the city. The first graduating class graduated in 1894. The "new" campus opened in 1912 with one building, the current History Building, with an enrollment of 50 students. The school sits on the hilltop between 4th and 7th streets and Pico and Olympic Blvds., from which one can see the Pacific Ocean. Ten years later the campus was expanded with construction of the English building. In 1921, the Open Air Memorial Theater (now called the Greek Amphitheatre) was built to honor the Santa Monicans who served in World War I. One of the best examples of the classical Greek style in Southern California, the amphitheater was built after Santa Monica passed a $30,000 bond measure to fund its construction. Barnum Hall Theater, originally called "the Auditorium," was built in 1937 by the Works Progress Administration (WPA) to be the Civic Auditorium of Santa Monica and host school events as well. The campus also added six buildings during this period: the Language, English, Business, History, Administration and Music Buildings.

In 1952, Santa Monica High School was finally expanded to what it is now, and two new buildings were built, the Science and Technology D.M. Buildings. As the school aged, renovations took place in Barnum Hall and the Music Building was completely rebuilt. As of February 2015, a new Science and Technology Building, known as the Innovation Building, has been constructed along with an outdoor gathering space called Centennial Plaza. On September 10, 2015, during "Back to School Night" the Innovation Building was unveiled to the public.

Houses
In 2003, Samohi adopted a house system, similar to college house systems; each student is part of a house. There are five houses: S, M, O, H and I, with each house assigned a building or a floor of a building. S House is stationed in the Language Building, M and O house are both stationed in the new Discovery Building, H house is stationed in the English Building, and I house is stationed in the Innovation Building. The "A" house was cut due to the California budget cuts to public schools. A principal oversees each of the houses, along with two counselors. Teachers with classrooms in a house building/floor are automatically deemed one of the house teachers with some slight exceptions. Upon enrollment in Santa Monica High School, students are randomly assigned to a house unless the student has already had a sibling in SAMOHI. In that case, the student has the option to join the house their sibling is in, or to join a new one.

Academics
The school also has an academic team which won the 2008 National Science Bowl competition as well as the 2017 National Ocean Sciences Bowl. Additionally, the quiz bowl team remains competitive in the Southern California circuit.

Music department

Orchestral program
In 2005, Symphony Orchestra was labeled the best high school-level orchestra in the nation by the American String Teachers Association (ASTA) at the National Orchestra Festival in Reno, Nevada. The orchestra program is made up of many different ensembles, ranging from the smaller Beginning Strings / String Orchestra to the large Symphony Orchestra. Many of the orchestras from Santa Monica High School have had the chance to travel around the nation and the world. In February 2006, Symphony Orchestra became the first public high school orchestra to perform in the Walt Disney Concert Hall in Downtown Los Angeles.

Marching band
The Santa Monica High School Viking Marching Band is one of the oldest high school marching bands in the state of California. The marching band performs for home football games and for many school and community events. The band enjoys a long history of competing in parades and field shows, most notably participating in shows sponsored by the SCSBOA (Southern California Student Band and Orchestra Association). In 2006, the marching band qualified for the first time in the SCSBOA 5A division championship.

Samohi currently offers five concert bands, with the Wind Ensemble recognized as one of the most exceptionally talented high school bands in California. The Wind Ensemble performed at Carnegie Hall in 2007 and 2015, as well as Chicago Symphony Hall in 2013. In 2016, the Wind Ensemble was selected to perform at the California All-State Music Educator's Conference (CASMEC) in San Jose. All ensembles regularly perform in festivals, conferences, and invitational concerts. The program enrolls over 300 students. The music program enjoys state of the art facilities and performance hall.

Athletics

Basketball
Girls Varsity team won the 2010 CIF Southern Division 1 championship, defeating Summit High, 69–63. It was the first girls basketball title for SAMOHI; they went on to the Fourth Round of State and lost by two.

Boys Varsity won the 2013 CIF Division 1A Southern Section Championship against El Toro High School 66–56 at the Anaheim Convention Center. They entered the Division 1 State Championship as a #1 seed, losing in the championship game, 73–57, to Pleasant Grove. They also made it to the finals of the 2010 CIF Southern Division 1 Championship, but they were defeated at the Honda Center against Luezinger, and they went on to lose in second round of state.

Cross country
The cross country team informally known as the "XC team" is composed of freshmen, sophomores, juniors and seniors. As of 2019, the Cross-country team competes in division 1 of CIF.

Wrestling
The wrestling team won the CIF State Championship in 1986. Also won the CIF State Championship in  weight class in 2007. For the past 7 years, the team has qualified individuals for the Southern Section CIF Masters and CIF State Championships.

Softball
The lady Vikings have been undefeated in league games since 2004. In 2010 and 2014 the lady Vikings won CIF division IV southern section.

Color guard
Samohi's color guard and winter guard team performs in shows sponsored by Winter Guard International and Winter Guard Association of Southern California (WGASC). Originally a joint drill team with Santa Monica College named the "Coronettes", the team utilizes both wooden guns and flags in their routines that are featured during halftime of every home football game. Additionally, after three years of membership, each participant receives a varsity letter. The team won gold medals in the WGASC championships in 2014, 2015, and 2016.

Notable alumni

 Lee Arenberg, actor
 Joan Blondell, actor
 Randolph Bresnik (class of 1985), Col. U.S.M.C., NASA astronaut
 Robert Downey Jr., actor
 John Ehrlichman, lawyer and political advisor to Nixon during the Watergate era
 Emilio Estevez, actor, director, screenwriter, producer
 Rhenzy Feliz, actor
 Ry Cooder, (class of 1964) composer, guitarist
 Glenn Ford, actor
 Christian Lee Hutson (class of 2009), singer-songwriter
 Anita Kanter (born 1933), tennis player
 Jonny Kim (class of 2002), NASA astronaut
 Rob Lowe, actor
 Chad Lowe, actor & director
 Stephen Miller, political advisor
 Sean Penn, actor
 Chris Penn, actor
 Ronda Rousey, UFC Women's Bantamweight Champion
 Terry Schofield, basketball player and coach
 Charlie Sheen, actor
 Tyler Skaggs, Major League Baseball player
 Madison Tung, wrestler, military officer, and Rhodes Scholar
 Robert Wagner, actor
 Tim Leary, baseball player
Holly Robinson Peete, actress
Karyn Parsons, actress
Dean Cain, actor

References

External links

 Santa Monica High School website
 
 http://www.samohi.smmusd.org/art/
 http://www.samohiband.org/
 http://www.samohichoir.org/
 http://www.samohiorchestras.org/
 http://www.samohitheatre.org/

1891 establishments in California
Educational institutions established in 1891
Buildings and structures in Santa Monica, California
High schools in Los Angeles County, California
Public high schools in California